Stuart Oliver (born 2 July 1963 in Hexham) is a British auto racing driver, who races in Truck Racing, where he has won many titles. He drives the Kelsa Truck Products Volvo Trucks RH13 in both the British Truck Racing Championship and the FIA European Truck Championship, for Team Oliver Racing.

Racing career

Truck Racing

He first entered the British Championship in 1998, finishing the season third on points and winning the title of Professional Driver of the Year. A year later in 1995, he was Truck racing champion, going on to dominate the championship in the following seasons. He was champion again in 1999, 2000, 2001, 2002, 2003, 2004, 2007, 2008, 2009 and 2010. In 2004 he also won the FIA European Truck Championship.

2011 Stuart Oliver joins Truck Race Team Allgäuer based in Weiler, Austria to compete in the FIA European Truck Championship.

BTCC

For 2008 he raced in saloon cars, in the British Touring Car Championship in-between truck events when there was no fixture clash. He raced in a Lexus IS200 and a SEAT Toledo Cupra for BTC Racing, but the car was both uncompetitive and unreliable, and he only drove in the first part of the season with no points.

T1 Prima Truck Racing Championship

At the inaugural T1 Prima Truck Racing Championship held by Tata Motors at the Buddh International Circuit in India, Stuart Oliver was crowned the first ever champion after winning both races on the single race day of the weekend long event. Stuart stated "It was an amazing experience. The track is beautiful and trucks were performing great. I am thrilled to have won the first ever truck racing championship in India, among the enthusiastic crowd who were cheering each time we drove past the grand stand. I see a lot of potential of this sport here and would love to come back and race again".

The T1 Prima Truck Racing Championship comprised two races, a 5-lap Sprint Race and a 15-lap Main Race, with the Champion Award granted to the winning driver on the basis of combined points from both the races. The Team Championship was awarded on the basis of the combined scores of the two drivers of the respective teams from both the races.

All the 12 Tata Prima trucks were Indian but were heavily modified, capable of putting out 370 hp and reaching a top speed of 110 km per hour (limited by FIA) driven by experienced drivers from BTRC.

Stuart also won the 2015 Edition of T1 Racing for Castrol VECTON.

Top Gear

It has been rumoured that Stuart Oliver appeared as the 'Rig Stig' on Top Gear Series 12, Episode 1. The episode saw the £5000 Lorry Challenge where the first event was to powerslide a lorry, with Oliver's own racing truck being used as a demonstration of this.

He has appeared on an episode on Top Gear (2002 TV series) driving a fuel truck in a race comprising airport vehicles.

Racing record

Complete British Touring Car Championship results
(key) (Races in bold indicate pole position - 1 point awarded in first race) (Races in italics indicate fastest lap - 1 point awarded all races) (* signifies that driver lead race for at least one lap - 1 point awarded all races)

References

External links
Official Site

British Touring Car Championship drivers
Living people
1963 births